is a railway station in Higashihiroshima, Hiroshima Prefecture, Japan, operated by West Japan Railway Company (JR West).

Lines
Saijō Station is served by the San'yō Main Line.

Layout
The station has one side platform, one island platform and a station office located on ground level. The two platforms are connected by a footbridge.

See also
 List of railway stations in Japan

External links

  

Railway stations in Hiroshima Prefecture
Sanyō Main Line
Railway stations in Japan opened in 1894